Keshar-e Bala (also Romanized as Keshār-e Bālā and Kashār-e Bālā; also known as Kashār-e ‘Olyā, Kashar ‘Olya, and Kishār Bāla) is a village in Kohurestan Rural District, in the Central District of Khamir County, Hormozgan Province, Iran. At the 2006 census, its population was 2,032, in 461 families.

References 

Populated places in Khamir County